Recipe for Success is a food reality television series that follows entrepreneurs who trade their jobs for following their dreams.

On Food Network's Canadian station, it is broadcast on Sundays at 2:30 PM. It uses the same theme song as The Next Food Network Star.

It also covers a popular TV competition in which a couple take over a restaurant they do not own for two sittings on a day in a bid to win £1,000. They are given a team of professional staff who will work to the amateurs' menus. One amateur takes on the role of Head Chef, while the other takes on the role of Front of House Manager. On the final day of the week, whoever has made the most money wins the money already won during that week. The show is presented by Simon Rimmer.

Food reality television series
2000s Canadian reality television series
Food Network (Canadian TV channel) original programming